Fumigaclavine may refer to:

 Fumigaclavine A
 Fumigaclavine B
 Fumigaclavine C